is a Japanese women's professional shogi player ranked 1-kyū.

Promotion history
Takahama's promotion history is as follows:
 3-kyū: April 1, 2014
 2-kyū: February 5, 2016
 1-kyū: September 17, 2021

Note: All ranks are women's professional ranks.

References

External links
 ShogiHub: Takahama, Aiko
 

Japanese shogi players
Living people
Women's professional shogi players
People from Osaka
Professional shogi players from Osaka Prefecture
1984 births